Aotus is an Australian genus of flowering plants, within the legume family Fabaceae. Aotus species, together with other species of the tribe Mirbelieae, are often called golden peas because of their distinctive small yellow flowers. They are endemic to Australia, occurring in all states except the Northern Territory. Aotus are evergreen species. Some are widely cultivated by gardeners for their ornamental value.

Species
Aotus comprises the following species:
 Aotus carinata Meissner
 Aotus cordifolia Benth.
 Aotus ericoides (Vent.) G.Don
 Aotus genistoides Turcz.
 Aotus gracillima Meissner
 Aotus intermedia Meissner
 Aotus lanigera Benth.
 Aotus mollis Benth.
 Aotus passerinoides Meissner
 Aotus phylicoides Benth.
 Aotus procumbens Meissner
 Aotus subglauca Blakeley & McKie
 Aotus subspinescens (Benth.) Crisp
 Aotus tietkensii F.Muell.

Species names with uncertain taxonomic status
The status of the following species is unresolved:
 Aotus coccinea Dum.Cours.
 Aotus diffusa C.A. Gardner
 Aotus dillwynioides Meisn.
 Aotus drummondii T.Moore
 Aotus franklandii Chappill & C.F.Wilkins
 Aotus gracilis Loudon
 Aotus lanea Chappill & C.F.Wilkins
 Aotus preissii Meisn.
 var. leiophylla (Meisn.) Meisn.
 var. preissii Meisn.
 Aotus prosacris Chappill & C.F.Wilkins
 Aotus virgata Sieber ex DC.
 Aotus wuerthii Regel

References

External links
 Aotus

Mirbelioids
Fabales of Australia
Fabaceae genera